The women's 200 metre individual medley event at the 2008 Olympic Games took place on 11–13 August at the Beijing National Aquatics Center in Beijing, China.

Australia's Stephanie Rice became the third swimmer in Olympic history to strike a medley double, since Michelle Smith did so in 1996 and Yana Klochkova in 2000 and 2004. She established a sterling time of 2:08.45 to lower her world record from the Olympic trials by almost half a second (0.50). Zimbabwe's Kirsty Coventry added a third silver to her collection, finishing with an African record of 2:08.59. U.S. swimmer Natalie Coughlin, who held the lead on the backstroke leg, picked up a bronze medal in 2:10.34.

Completing the second half of a difficult double, American Katie Hoff produced the same result from the 200 m freestyle, as she finished again in fourth place with a time of 2:10.68. Australia's Alicia Coutts placed fifth in 2:11.43, while Japan's Asami Kitagawa swam the outside lane to finish the race in sixth place at 2:11.56. On the strength of the breaststroke leg, Kitagawa won a swimoff for the last slot in the top 8 final over Hungary's Evelyn Verrasztó. Canada's Julia Wilkinson (2:12.43) and Poland's Katarzyna Baranowska (2:13.36) closed out the field.

Earlier in the semifinals, Coventry established an Olympic standard of 2:09.53 to cut off Yana Klochkova's eight-year record by a 1.15-second deficit.

Records 

Prior to this competition, the existing world and Olympic records were as follows.

The following new world and Olympic records were set during this competition.

Results

Heats

Semifinals

Semifinal 1

Semifinal 2

Swimoff

Final

References

External links
Official Olympic Report

Women's individual medley 200 metre
2008 in women's swimming
Women's events at the 2008 Summer Olympics